The Marshall Islands competed at the 2020 Summer Olympics in Tokyo. Originally scheduled to take place from 24 July to 9 August 2020, the Games were postponed to 23 July to 8 August 2021, due to the COVID-19 pandemic. It was the nation's fourth appearance at the Summer Olympics.

Competitors
The following is the list of competitors in the Games.

Swimming

The Marshall Islands received a universality invitation from FINA to send two top-ranked swimmers (one per gender) in their respective individual events to the Olympics, based on the FINA Points System of 28 June 2021.

References

Olympics
2020
Nations at the 2020 Summer Olympics